The 19th Los Angeles Film Critics Association Awards, honoring the best in film for 1993, were given on 11 December 1993.

Winners
Best Picture:
Schindler's List
Runner-up: The Piano
Best Director:
Jane Campion – The Piano
Runner-up: Robert Altman – Short Cuts
Best Actor:
Anthony Hopkins – Shadowlands and The Remains of the Day
Runner-up: Daniel Day-Lewis – The Age of Innocence and In the Name of the Father
Best Actress:
Holly Hunter – The Piano
Runner-up: Debra Winger – Shadowlands and A Dangerous Woman
Best Supporting Actor:
Tommy Lee Jones – The Fugitive
Runner-up: Ralph Fiennes – Schindler's List
Best Supporting Actress (tie):
Anna Paquin – The Piano
Rosie Perez – Fearless
Best Screenplay:
Jane Campion – The Piano
Runner-up: Robert Altman and Frank Barhydt – Short Cuts
Best Cinematography (tie):
Stuart Dryburgh – The Piano
Janusz Kamiński – Schindler's List
Best Production Design:
Allan Starski - Schindler's List
Runner-up: Dante Ferretti – The Age of Innocence
Best Music Score:
Zbigniew Preisner – Blue (Trois couleurs: Bleu), The Secret Garden and Olivier, Olivier
Runner-up: Michael Nyman – The Piano
Best Foreign-Language Film:
Farewell My Concubine (Ba wang bie ji) • China/Hong Kong
Runner-up: Blue (Trois couleurs: Bleu) • France/Poland/Switzerland
Best Non-Fiction Film:
It's All True: Based on an Unfinished Film by Orson Welles
Best Animation:
The Mighty River (Le fleuve aux grandes eaux) (feature)
The Very Hungry Caterpillar & Other Stories (short) 
The Douglas Edwards Experimental/Independent Film/Video Award:
Peter Friedman and Tom Joslin – Silverlake Life: The View from Here
New Generation Award:
Leonardo DiCaprio – This Boy's Life and What's Eating Gilbert Grape
Career Achievement Award:
John Alton

References

External links
19th Annual Los Angeles Film Critics Association Awards

1993
1993 film awards
1993 in American cinema
December 1993 events in the United States